is an American professional soccer club based in Orange County, California.

History
The club was founded by Bronwyn & Pete Capriotti and Michael Collins, who have had connections to the adult amateur United Premier Soccer League.

California United FC intended to join the North American Soccer League (NASL) as an expansion franchise for the 2018 season. However, due to the instability of the league, California United withdrew its franchise agreement from NASL in early 2018 and announced that it was exploring all professional league options for the 2019 season. On November 15, 2018, the club was announced as a participant in the 2019 NPSL Founders Cup and as a founding member of a new league to being in 2020. 

On March 2, 2019, the team tweeted out their intention to withdraw from the NPSL and NPSL Founders Cup. Three months later, on June 10, 2019, the team was accepted into the National Independent Soccer Association (NISA) as a member for the league's inaugural season.

The club participated in the Western Conference NISA championship in Fall 2019. On November 10, 2019, the team won the 2019 NISA Western Conference championship.

Players and staff

Current roster

Marcus Lee

Year-by-year

California United FC II
California United maintains a second Team which participates in the Pro Premier division of the United Premier Soccer League (UPSL). The team played as the L.A. Wolves FC in the 2017 UPSL Spring Season, then as OC Invicta in the 2017 UPSL Fall Season. Both teams were coached by Eric Wynalda and both were crowned UPSL National Champions in each season. In the Fall 2018 season, under the California United FC II name, the team went undefeated(13–0–0) and won a third UPSL National Championship.

Additionally, as L.A. Wolves FC the team placed third in the United States Adult Soccer Association (USASA) 2017 National Championship in Milwaukee, Wisconsin.

The club also maintains an academy team in Irvine, called the Irvine Strikers.

References

External links
 

Association football clubs established in 2017
2017 establishments in California
Sports in Fullerton, California
Soccer clubs in California
Soccer clubs in Greater Los Angeles
North American Soccer League teams
National Independent Soccer Association teams
Sports in Irvine, California